Desperate Trails can refer to:

 Desperate Trails (1921 film), a 1921 film
 Desperate Trails (1939 film), a 1939 film
 The Desperate Trail, a 1994 film